Tororo–Mbale–Soroti Road is a road in Eastern Uganda, connecting the towns of Tororo in Tororo District to Mbale in Mbale District and Soroti in Soroti District.

Location
The coordinates of the road north of Mbale are:1°08'20.0"N, 34°09'54.0"E (Latitude:1.138889; Longitude:34.165000).

Overview
In 2010 the road, previously gravel surfaced, began to undergo upgrades to class II bitumen surface and installation of shoulders and drainage channels. Dott Services Limited of Uganda, was selected as the main contractor. The Mbale–Soroti Section, which cost USh108 billion, was commissioned on 27 July 2015. The Tororo-Mbale Section, whose renovation price was USh63.8 billion was commissioned in August 2015. The renovations were 100% funded by the Ugandan government.

Unsatisfactory work
When UNRA officials inspected this road in June 2016, prior to certifying the work as complete, they found it unsatisfactory. The contractor, Dott Services Limited, will have to repair the defects before collecting the USh60 billion final payment.

See also
 List of roads in Uganda

References

External links
The Secret to Museveni’s 2016-2021 Schemes Lies In Tororo-Mbale Road

Roads in Uganda
Soroti District
Kumi District
Ngora District
Bukedea District
Mbale District
Tororo District
Teso sub-region
Bugisu sub-region
Eastern Region, Uganda